The Mustang 2-class patrol boat, also known as Project 18623, is a Russian Coast Guard vessel. The patrol craft were originally designed to be operated by the Ministry of Fisheries, but those duties were transferred to the Coast Guard in 1998. The boats were designed for general border protection and fisheries duties.

Design
The patrol craft are constructed with an aluminum hull and superstructure and can operate in sea states up to 5. They were designed by the Redan Bureau. The 4th boat, Sokol was designated as a communications boat. The boats are equipped with 2 Zvezda M-470 diesel engines, and are equipped with weapons to engage surface targets. PSKA-816, and 818 are a part of the Caspian Flotilla, PSKA-817 is a part of the Baltic Fleet.

See also
List of ships of Russia by project number

References

Patrol vessels